The Just Group owns and operates a total of seven retail brands: Just Jeans (Australian clothing chain store), Jay Jays, Jacqui E, Portmans, Dotti, Peter Alexander Sleepwear (through an agreement with Peter Alexander), and Smiggle. The group has over 1,000 stores throughout Australia, New Zealand, Singapore and the United Kingdom.

History
The brand Just Jeans was founded in 1970 by the Kimberly family. The first store opened on Chapel Street, Prahran. The idea of selling jeans stacked on shelves was new to the market, but proved to be popular.

On 8 August 2008, Premier Investments obtained a controlling interest in the shares of Just Group Limited following an off-market takeover offer for all of the group shares that commenced on 31 March 2008. Just Group Limited was removed from the official ASX list on 22 September 2008 and became a non listed public company.

In 2011, the group was nailed by the media for using sandblasting to wash off their jeans, a method known to cause silicosis. In 2013, the group was still using sandblasting. The Baptist World Aid's 2015 Fashion Report named the Just Group one of the worst performers when it comes to protecting international workers. From 2012 to 2015, the group went through its digital retail transformation.

In October 2016, the Just Group lost its trial against its former CFO Nicole Peck who had left the company to work for a competing company. In August 2017, the brand director of the group, Colette Garnsey, stepped down for medical reasons.

Richard Murray commenced as Premier Retail Chief Executive Officer on 6 September 2021, and was appointed to the Premier Board as executive director on 3 December 2021.

References

External links
 
 Just Group History

Clothing retailers of Australia
Clothing retailers of New Zealand
Retail companies established in 1970
Australian companies established in 1970
Jeans by brand
Holding companies of Australia